William Patenson (born in Yorkshire or Durham; executed at Tyburn, 22 January 1591–2) was an English Roman Catholic priest and martyr. He was beatified in 1929.

Life

Admitted to the English College, Reims, 1 May 1584, he was ordained to the priesthood in September 1587, and left for the English mission 17 January 1588–9.

On the third Sunday of Advent, 1591, he said Mass in the house of Lawrence Mompesson at Clerkenwell, and while dining with another priest, James Young, the priest-catchers surprised them. Young found a hiding-place, but Patenson was arrested and condemned at the Old Bailey after Christmas. According to Young, while in prison he converted and reconciled three or four thieves before their death. The night before his martyrdom, according to Richard Verstegan, Patenson converted six out of seven felons who occupied the condemned cell with him. Because he did this, he was cut down while still conscious and quartered alive.

Sources

John Hungerford Pollen, Acts of the English Martyrs (London, 1891), pp. 115–117
John Hungerford Pollen, English Martyrs 1584–1603 (London, 1908), pp. 208, 292
Richard Challoner, Memoirs of Missionary Priests, I, no. 94 (London, 1843), pp. 292–293
Thomas Francis Knox, Douay Diaries (London, 1878), pp. 201, 217, 222

Notes

1592 deaths
16th-century English Roman Catholic priests
Martyred Roman Catholic priests
English beatified people
16th-century Roman Catholic martyrs
16th-century venerated Christians
Year of birth unknown
One Hundred and Seven Martyrs of England and Wales